Christian Adolph "Sonny" Jurgensen III (born August 23, 1934) is an American former professional football player who was a quarterback in the National Football League (NFL) for 18 seasons, playing for the Philadelphia Eagles and Washington Redskins. He was inducted into the Pro Football Hall of Fame in 1983. Jurgensen was also a longtime color commentary for Washington's radio broadcast crew.

Early life
Jurgensen was born on August 23, 1934, in Wilmington, North Carolina. He started playing sports in elementary school, when he led his school to the city grammar school titles in baseball and basketball.  He later won Wilmington's youth tennis championship and pitched for his local Civitan club, which won the city baseball title.

High school
Jurgensen attended and played high school football at New Hanover High School.  He played a number of positions for the team and as a junior was a backup quarterback on the state championship team.  After a senior year where he scored three touchdowns and kicked nine extra points, he was chosen to start at quarterback for the North Carolina team in the annual North Carolina vs. South Carolina Shrine Bowl in Charlotte, North Carolina.

Jurgensen also played basketball and baseball during high school.  As a senior on the basketball team, he averaged 12 points per game as a guard and the team was the state title runner-up.  That same year in baseball, he batted .339 and played as a pitcher, infielder, and catcher.  He also became a switch-hitter.

College career
Jurgensen attended and played college football at Duke University. He joined the varsity team in 1954 as a backup quarterback behind Jerry Barger and he completed 12 of 28 passes for 212 yards, with one touchdown and three interceptions.

But Jurgensen made the biggest impact that season as a defensive back, when he tied a team record with interceptions in four consecutive games. and ended the season with five interceptions. Duke finished the campaign with a 7–2–1 regular-season record and an Atlantic Coast Conference title. Then on New Year's Day, Duke beat the Nebraska Cornhuskers 34–7 in the 1955 Orange Bowl.

Jurgensen took over as starting quarterback in 1955. He also retained a starting position in the defensive secondary.

Duke ended the season with a 7–2–1 record along with an ACC co-championship, but did not go to a bowl because Maryland received the league's automatic bid to the Orange Bowl. That season Jurgensen completed 37 of 69 passes for 536 yards, three touchdowns and seven interceptions. He rushed 54 times for 48 yards and scored two touchdowns. He also punted four times for a 33.7 average and intercepted four passes for 17 yards.

Jurgensen's senior season in 1956 did not start well, when Duke lost to South Carolina, 7–0, in the season opener. This game marked Duke's first ACC loss, coming in the fourth year of the conference's existence. Duke finished the season with a 5–4–1 mark and Jurgensen ended up 28–59 for 371 yards.

He threw six interceptions and two touchdown passes and rushed 25 times for 51 yards with three touchdowns. Jurgensen's final career stats included 77–156 passes for 1,119 yards, 16 career interceptions and six touchdowns. He also rushed for 109 yards and intercepted 10 passes.

Jurgensen also played baseball briefly at Duke, but turned down an invitation to try out for the basketball team.

Before being drafted by the NFL,  Jurgensen worked as a Sunday school bus driver in Herndon, Virginia.

Professional career

Philadelphia Eagles (1957–1963)

Jurgensen was drafted in the fourth round of the 1957 NFL Draft by the Philadelphia Eagles.  He was Philadelphia's backup quarterback, behind Bobby Thomason in 1957 and Norm Van Brocklin, from 1958 through 1960. It was during this time as a backup that Jurgensen was a part of a championship team for the only time in his professional career, when the Eagles won the 1960 NFL Championship, although Jurgensen did not appear in any postseason games.

After Van Brocklin retired in 1961, Jurgensen took over as Philadelphia's starter and had a successful year, passing for an NFL record 3,723 yards, tying the NFL record with 32 touchdown passes, and was named All-Pro. Following an injury-plagued 1963 season, Jurgensen was traded to the Washington Redskins on April 1, 1964, in exchange for quarterback Norm Snead and cornerback Claude Crabb.

Washington Redskins (1964–1974)

Jurgensen took over play-calling for the Redskins during the 1964 season. He was then selected to play in the Pro Bowl following the season and was also named second Team All-Pro.

One of Jurgensen's most memorable games was during the 1965 season, when the Cowboys took a 21–0 lead at DC Stadium. Jurgensen then threw for 411 yards, leading the team back to win 34–31. He rushed for a touchdown on a quarterback sneak and threw a game-winning 35-yard pass to Bobby Mitchell.

In 1967, Jurgensen broke his own record by passing for 3,747 yards and also set NFL single-season records for attempts (508) and completions (288). He missed much of the 1968 season because of broken ribs and elbow surgery. He did, however, tie an NFL record early in the 1968 season for the longest pass play in NFL history. The 99-yard pass play to Jerry Allen occurred September 15, 1968, during the Redskins' game against the Chicago Bears. Coincidentally, Redskins' quarterbacks had three of the first four occurrences of a 99-yard pass play (Frank Filchock to Andy Farkas in 1939 and George Izo to Bobby Mitchell in 1963 were the other two occurrences of the play). Since Jurgensen's feat, no other Redskins' quarterback has completed a 99-yard pass.

In 1969, Vince Lombardi took over as the Redskins' head coach. That season, Jurgensen led the NFL in attempts (442), completions (274), completion percentage (62%), and passing yards (3,102). The Redskins went 7–5–2 and had their best season since 1955 (which kept Lombardi's record of never having coached a losing NFL team intact). Lombardi died of cancer shortly before the start of the 1970 season. Jurgensen would later say that, of the nine head coaches he played for during his NFL career, Lombardi was his favorite.

The Redskins enjoyed a resurgence in the early 1970s under coach George Allen and made it as far as Super Bowl VII, losing to the Miami Dolphins. However, Billy Kilmer started in place of Jurgensen, who was again bothered by injuries in 1971 and 1972.

During this period, a quarterback controversy developed between the two, complete with fans sporting "I Love Billy" or "I Love Sonny" bumper stickers on their vehicles. The defensive-minded Allen preferred Kilmer's conservative, ball-control style of play to Jurgensen's more high-risk approach. Despite the controversy, Jurgensen was helpful to his rival. Even to this day, Kilmer still stays at Jurgensen's house when he is in town.

In 1974, at the age of 40 and in his final season, Jurgensen won his third NFL passing crown even though he was still splitting time with Kilmer. In what would be the final game of his NFL career, Jurgensen made his first and only appearance in an NFL postseason game in the Redskins' 19–10 loss to the Los Angeles Rams in the first round of the 1974 NFC playoffs. He came off the bench in relief of Kilmer and completed six of 12 passes but also threw three interceptions.

Jurgensen is recognized as the finest pure passer of his time. A five-time Pro Bowl selection, he earned three NFL individual passing titles. He exceeded 400 yards passing in a single game five times, and threw five touchdown passes in a game twice. With a career rating of 82.6, his stats include 2,433 completions for 32,224 yards and 255 touchdowns. He also rushed for 493 yards and 15 touchdowns.

Jurgensen's 82.62 career passer rating is the highest for any player in the "Dead Ball Era" (pre-1978).

Lombardi would later tell Pat Peppler of the Green Bay Packers head office that, "If we would have had Sonny Jurgensen in Green Bay, we’d never have lost a game.”

NFL career statistics

After football

Broadcasting career

After retiring from the Redskins following the 1974 season, Jurgensen began another career as a color commentator, initially with CBS television. Later teaming with Hall of Fame linebacker Sam Huff, Jurgensen continued to cover the Washington Redskins on radio.

He covered the team for WRC-TV from 1994 until December 2008, when Redskins Report was canceled due to budget cuts. He served as a game analyst at preseason games and as studio analyst at training camp, making weekly picks, and other assignments. He retired from broadcasting prior to the 2019 season.

Honors
Jurgensen was inducted into the North Carolina Sports Hall of Fame in 1971 and the Duke Sports Hall of Fame in 1979.  He was then inducted into the Pro Football Hall of Fame in 1983.   In 1999, Jurgensen was ranked the ninth best sports figure from North Carolina by Sports Illustrated and became a member of Wilmington's Walk of Fame in 2004.

Washington retired Jurgensen's #9 jersey in 2022, during their Week 18 game against the Dallas Cowboys.

Community service
He serves on the board of advisors of the Code of Support Foundation, a nonprofit military services organization.

References

External links

 
 

1934 births
Living people
Players of American football from North Carolina
American football quarterbacks
Washington Redskins players
Philadelphia Eagles players
Duke Blue Devils football players
Eastern Conference Pro Bowl players
National Basketball Association broadcasters
National Football League announcers
National Football League players with retired numbers
American people of Norwegian descent
Sportspeople from Wilmington, North Carolina
Pro Football Hall of Fame inductees
College football announcers
Washington Redskins announcers